Dimple Patel is an Indian supermodel and the winner of The Miss Globe 2016. She represented India in Miss Globe 2016 pageant, held in Tirana, Albania in November 2016. Patel was crowned as the winner, and became the first Indian to win the pageant.

Modeling career
As a fashion model, Patel has modeled for Lakme Fashion Week, Couture Week, India International Jewelry Week, Pune Fashion Week, Dubai Fashion Week, and Nairobi Fashion Week. She has also walked the ramp for fashion designers like Manish Malhotra, Vikram Phadnis, Sabyasachi Mukherjee, Neeta Lulla, and Falguni Shane Peacock.

References

Living people
Date of birth missing (living people)
Female models from Mumbai
Miss Globe International winners
Year of birth missing (living people)